The following table lists various orders of magnitude for angular momentum, in Joule-seconds.

Table

See also
Orders of magnitude (angular velocity)
Orders of magnitude (momentum)

References

External links

Angular momentum
Angular momentum